Euphorbia apios is a species of plant in the family Euphorbiaceae.

References

apios
Plants described in 1753
Taxa named by Carl Linnaeus